Melodorum is a genus of plant in the Annonaceae family.

Species
Genus Melodorum contains 55 species, among which the following deserve mention:
Melodorum fruticosum, White cheesewood, national flower of Cambodia and provincial flower of Sisaket Province, Thailand (ลำดวน)
Melodorum leichhardtii
Melodorum siamense
Melodorum uhrii
Melodorum verrucosum

References

Annonaceae genera
Annonaceae